Mohamed Abu Arisha (محمد ابو عريشة; born November 10, 1997) is a Palestinian citizen of Israel basketball player that ha s played for Hapoel Be'er Sheva of the Israeli Basketball Premier League, and has played for the Israeli national basketball team. Currently, he plays for Moroccan basketball team AMI Basket. He plays the forward position.

Biography

Abu Arisha was born in Hadera, Israel, and is an Arab-Israeli.  His hometown is Fureidis Village, Israel. His parents are Dalia and Khader. He is 6' 7" (201 cm) tall, and weighs 200 pounds (91 kg).

He attended high school in Hod HaSharon, Israel, and played club ball with Wingate Basketball Academy in Israel. Abu Arisha then attended Elev8 Sports Academy ('16) in Delray Beach, Florida.

Abu Arisha attended Jacksonville State University in 2016-18, playing basketball for the Jacksonville State Gamecocks. He then attended Kentucky Wesleyan College ('20) on scholarship. He played basketball for the Kentucky Wesleyan Panthers. In 2018-19 he averaged 11.6 points per game, and 7.7 rebounds per game.

He played for the Israeli national basketball team in the 2016 FIBA U20 European Championship, averaging 5.2 points per game.

Abu Arisha plays for Hapoel Be'er Sheva of the Israeli Basketball Premier League, with whom he signed in May 2020.

References 

1997 births
Living people
Forwards (basketball)
Hapoel Be'er Sheva B.C. players
Israeli men's basketball players
Israeli expatriate basketball people in the United States
Jacksonville State Gamecocks men's basketball players
Kentucky Wesleyan Panthers men's basketball players
People from Haifa District